Alan Dimitri Baudot (born February 1, 1988) is a French mixed martial artist who competes in the Heavyweight division. He has previously fought in the Ultimate Fighting Championship.

Background
Alan Baudot was born on the slopes of the Croix-Rousse in Lyon, in a modest environment, with his parents originally from Martinique, from the commune of Schœlcher. At the age of 12, his mother and stepfather decided to leave the city and move to the countryside, near Besançon, in Franche-Comté. Growing up amongst cows and farms, Baudot had a pleasant childhood, with Besançon being where he started judo, his first sensations in combat sports. At the same time, he played rugby in Fédérale 2 (4e division) and tried his hand at fist-fighting. In love with martial arts, he turned to contact sports such as kick-boxing and muay-thai at the age of 19. As for his studies, Alan obtained a BEP (vocational diploma) and then a professional diploma in cooking and a CAP (vocational training certificate) in masonry. He accumulated jobs and never stopped working, for example, as assistant manager of a hotel, delivery driver or receptionist. Learning was also a constant for Baudot, as he holds a professional diploma from the Ministry of Youth, Popular Education and Sport (BPJEPS). Alan is also a coach specialized in pugilistic activities (boxing).

Passionate about Japanese culture, he took the lead and decided to go to Japan at the age of 22, with his friend Mathieu Muller. With his friend, they wanted to open a delicatessen in Tokyo to sell products from Franche-Comté. Arriving there with dreams, they had nothing set aside, had no training in international trade. Once there, the two friends were disappointed. Launching a business in Japan as an expatriate was a real obstacle course and the project of the two friends dreamers collapsed. It was there in 2013 that Baudot decided to let off steam by entering Hayato Sakurai's gym. Three months passed between his first steps in MMA and his first fight, however Baudot had to return to France because his visa had expired. Two weeks later, Hayato Sakurai paid for Baudot's plane ticket to come back to Japan for the bout, which he won and earned 600 euros. Since MMA does not allow him to live, the Frenchman works as a bouncer in the bustling Roppongi district of Tokyo while also doing some kick-boxing and muay-thai fights, leading him to nicknamed "The Black Samurai".

Mixed martial arts career

Early career
After a seven-month break, back in France, during the 2016/2017 season, the Martinique native was offered to join the legendary "MMA Factory" stable. Fernand Lopez the former coach of the MMA World Champion Francis Ngannou and current coach of the Guadeloupean Ciryl Gane, takes him in hand. "I train with them and then Fernand Lopez, who is looking for trainers and loves excellence, asks me to find out more so that I can get a diploma. That's how I got my Brevet professionnel de la Jeunesse, de l'Education populaire et du Sport (BPJEPS), specializing in pugilistic activities", he confides.

Baudot faced Todd Stoute at TKO 47: Jourdain vs. Lapilus on April 11, 2019. After losing the bout by rear-naked choke in the third round, the bout was later overturned to a DQ win for Baudot after Stoute tested positive for 100 nanograms of THC.

Ultimate Fighting Championship
Baudot, as a short notice replacement for Sergey Spivak, faced Tom Aspinall at UFC Fight Night: Moraes vs. Sandhagen on October 11, 2020. Baudot lost the fight via first-round technical knockout.

Baudot was scheduled to face Rodrigo Nascimento on May 22, 2021, at UFC Fight Night: Font vs. Garbrandt. However, after Baudot was injured, the bout was moved to UFC on ESPN: Makhachev vs. Moisés held on July 17, 2021. Baudot lost the fight via technical knockout in round two. However, Nascimento's urine test from the fight tested positive for ritalinic acid, a metabolite of psychostimulant drugs methylphenidate and ethylphenidate. As a result, the bout was also overturned to a no contest.

Baudot faced Parker Porter on February 19, 2022, at UFC Fight Night: Walker vs. Hill. He lost the fight via unanimous decision.

Baudot faced Josh Parisian on June 25, 2022, at UFC on ESPN 38. Despite winning the first round against Parisian, Baudot lost the fight via technical knockout in the second round.

In July 2022, it was announced that Baudot was no longer on the UFC roster.

Championships and accomplishments
HEAT
HEAT Light Heavyweight Championship (One time) 
One successful title defense

Mixed martial arts record

|-
|Loss
|align=center|8–4 (1)
|Josh Parisian
|TKO (punches)
|UFC on ESPN: Tsarukyan vs. Gamrot
|
|align=center|2
|align=center|3:04
|Las Vegas, Nevada, United States
|
|-
|Loss
|align=center|8–3 (1)
|Parker Porter
|Decision (unanimous)
|UFC Fight Night: Walker vs. Hill
|
|align=center|3
|align=center|5:00
|Las Vegas, Nevada, United States
|
|-
|NC
|align=center|8–2 (1)
|Rodrigo Nascimento
|NC (overturned)
|UFC on ESPN: Makhachev vs. Moisés
|
|align=center|2
|align=center|1:29
|Las Vegas, Nevada, United States
|
|-
|Loss
|align=center| 8–2
|Tom Aspinall
|TKO (elbows and punches)
|UFC Fight Night: Moraes vs. Sandhagen
|
|align=center|1
|align=center|1:35
|Abu Dhabi, United Arab Emirates
|
|-
|Win
|align=center| 8–1
|Todd Stoute
| DQ (overturned by promoter)
|TKO 47: Jourdain vs. Lapilus
|
|align=center|3
|align=center|3:54
|Montreal, Canada
|
|-
|Win
|align=center| 7–1
|Yuto Nakajima
|TKO (punches)
|Mach Matsuri 2018
|
|align=center|1
|align=center|4:16
|Tokyo, Japan
|
|-
|Loss
|align=center| 6–1
|Dalcha Lungiambula
|KO (punch)
|EFC Worldwide 61
|
|align=center|1
|align=center|0:26
|North West Province, South Africa
|
|-
|Win
|align=center| 6–0
|Yusuke Masuda
|KO (punches)
|HEAT 39
|
|align=center|2
|align=center|3:23
|Nagoya, Japan
|
|-
|Win
|align=center| 5–0
|Chul Yeon Jung
|TKO (punches)
|Angel's Fighting 1
|
|align=center| 1
|align=center| N/A
|Seoul, South Korea
|
|-
|Win
|align=center| 4–0
|Dong Xing Wu
|TKO (punches)
|Grandslam MMA 4
|
|align=center|1
|align=center|1:16
|Tokyo, Japan
| 
|-
|Win
|align=center| 3–0
|Shunsuke Inoue
|TKO (punches)
|HEAT 36
|
|align=center|5
|align=center|0:22
|Nagoya, Japan
|
|-
|Win
|align=center| 2–0
| Yuji Sakuragi
|TKO (punches)
|Grandslam MMA 3
|
|align=center| 1
|align=center| 2:35
|Tokyo, Japan
|
|-
|Win
|align=center|1–0
|Akira Iezaki
|TKO (punches)
|GRACHAN 10
|
|align=center|1
|align=center|2:09
|Tokyo, Japan
|

See also 

 List of male mixed martial artists

References

External links 
  
 

1988 births
Living people
French male mixed martial artists
French mixed martial artists of Black African descent
Heavyweight mixed martial artists
Mixed martial artists utilizing Muay Thai
Mixed martial artists utilizing judo
Ultimate Fighting Championship male fighters
French Muay Thai practitioners
French male judoka